All Aboard is a 1927 American comedy film directed by Charles Hines and written by Matt Taylor. The film stars Johnny Hines, Edna Murphy, Dot Farley, Henry A. Barrows, Frank Hagney and Babe London. The film was released on May 1, 1927, by First National Pictures.

Cast      
Johnny Hines as Johnny
Edna Murphy as May Brooks
Dot Farley as Aunt Patsy
Henry A. Barrows as Thomas Brooks
Frank Hagney as Ali Ben Ome
Babe London as Princess
Sojin as Prince 
James Leonard as El Humid

References

External links
 

1927 films
1920s English-language films
Silent American comedy films
1927 comedy films
First National Pictures films
American silent feature films
American black-and-white films
Films directed by Charles Hines
1920s American films